Melovoy is a rural locality (a khutor) in Novotikhonovskoye Rural Settlement, Staropoltavsky District, Volgograd Oblast, Russia. The population was 84 as of 2010. There are 6 streets.

Geography 
Melovoy is located in steppe, on the right bank of the Solyanka River, 51 km south of Staraya Poltavka (the district's administrative centre) by road. Torgunsky is the nearest rural locality.

References 

Rural localities in Staropoltavsky District